Second Album is the second studio album by English progressive rock band Curved Air, released in 1971. It reached No. 11 in the UK Charts on 9 October 1971, and "Back Street Luv" became a UK No. 4 chart hit on 7 August 1971.

Both variations of the album cover include a rainbow, a reference to the album A Rainbow in Curved Air by Terry Riley, from which the band took their name.

Background and recording
The content and arrangement of the material reflected a sharp division in the band which would lead to their break-up the following year; all the songs on side A were composed by Darryl Way (with some assistance from Ian Eyre) with lyrics by Sonja Kristina, while all those on side B were composed by Francis Monkman. Francis Monkman explained: "Basically Darryl and I respect each others' work, but we don't really see eye-to-eye on most things. And we never really got the co-writing thing together. I wanted to get my first 'epic' together, so it looks like a split forming (at the time of the "Second Album")."

Unlike Curved Air's first album, Second Album was recorded when most of the songs were freshly written and had had little time to be developed over the course of touring. An exception is "Young Mother", which in fact started as a song by Way, Monkman, and Pilkington-Miksa's pre-Curved Air band, Sisyphus. Then titled "Young Mother in Style", it evolved into the form seen on Second Album in part through the addition of new lyrics by Sonja Kristina.

The electronics used on the album were provided by E.M.S. London, later the recording site for two tracks on Curved Air's third album, Phantasmagoria.

Reception

AllMusic's review of the CD reissue was largely negative, saying that the album lacks the innovation and originality of the band's other releases, replaced by "a crop of relatively straightforward but sonically flat rock songs". It notes that the album contains "Back Street Luv", which it says "isn't simply one of the band's own finest moments, it's also one of the crucial singles of the early 1970s." It further added that only "Piece of Mind" shows any of the classical influences the band was known for, and that, while "spine-tingling" in part, the song also contains features which are by modern standards "hopelessly old-fashioned", "obvious", and "hackneyed". The review suggests that poor sound quality following the transfer to CD may have contributed to the reviewer's less than favourable assessment of the album. Further, this review does not necessarily reflect the views of fans, many of whom consider it to be on par with the albums bookending it.

Track listing

Side One
 "Young Mother" (Darryl Way, Sonja Kristina Linwood) – 5:55
 "Back Street Luv" (Way, Linwood, Ian Eyre) – 3:38
 "Jumbo" (Way, Linwood) – 4:11
 "You Know" (Way, Linwood) – 4:11
 "Puppets" (Way, Linwood) – 5:26

Side Two
 "Everdance" (Francis Monkman) – 3:08
 "Bright Summer's Day '68" (Monkman) – 2:54
 "Piece of Mind" (Monkman) – 12:52

Personnel
Curved Air
Sonja Kristina – lead vocals
Darryl Way – violin, backing vocals, piano (5)
Francis Monkman – guitars, keyboards, VCS3 synthesizer
Ian Eyre – bass guitar
Florian Pilkington-Miksa – drums
Technical
Colin Caldwell – engineer
Peter Zinovieff – electronics "by courtesy of"
John Kosh – album design

Other covers
Salad covered "Back Street Luv" on the 1996 Childline charity album.

References

1971 albums
Curved Air albums
Warner Records albums
albums recorded at Morgan Sound Studios